Descender is the debut solo album by American singer/songwriter Andrew Wyatt of the indie dance trio Miike Snow. In a departure from his work with his main project and work as a producer, Wyatt recorded the album in Prague backed by a 75-piece orchestra, with guest appearances by The Libertines' Anthony Rossomando, Interpol's touring bassist Brad Truax, and Tortoise's John Herndon.

Track listing
 "Horse Latitudes" – 4:07
 "Harlem Boyzz" – 3:07
 "Cluster Subs" – 2:59
 "She's Changed" – 2:33
 "And Septimus..." – 3:31
 "It Won't Let You Go" – 3:56
 "Descender (Death Of 1000 Cuts)" – 2:37
 "In Paris They Know How To Build A Monument" – 3:16
 "There Is A Spring" – 3:49

References

2013 albums